Biologia Plantarum is a peer-reviewed open-access scientific journal covering experimental botany. It was established in 1959 by the Czech plant physiologist Bohumil Němec. It is published by the Institute of Experimental Botany, Czech Academy of Sciences, but was previously published by Springer Science+Business Media until 2018.

The editor-in-chief is Jana Pospíšilová (Czech Academy of Sciences). Since 2019, it is an open-access journal, whose articles are distributed under the terms of the Creative Commons BY-NC-ND licence. While the journal had a print version in the past, it is now only published online.

Abstracting and indexing
The journal is indexed and abstracted in the following bibliographic databases:

According to the Journal Citation Reports, the journal has a 2018 impact factor of 1.384.

References

External links

Botany journals
Publications established in 1959
Creative Commons Attribution-licensed journals
Quarterly journals
English-language journals
Czech Academy of Sciences
1959 establishments in Czechoslovakia